What a Wonderful World is a 2004 album by American country pop recording artist LeAnn Rimes. It is her sixth studio album and first Christmas album, consisting of jazz inspired holiday music. Rimes released four promotional singles from this album: "O Holy Night", "Rockin' Around the Christmas Tree", "Have Yourself a Merry Little Christmas", and "A Different Kind of Christmas".  Rimes also co-wrote three tracks on this holiday album, one of which with her then husband Dean Sheremet. "Santa Baby" was released as a limited  exclusive bonus track on the album at US Target stores. It was also released as an exclusive bonus track on the Australian, Japanese and UK versions of the album and was the fifth promotional single.

Track listing

Personnel 

 Steve Baxter – trombone
 Chris Bruce – acoustic guitar
 Leon "Ndugu" Chancler – drums
 John Chiodini – electric guitar
 Kevin St. Clair – choir
 Greg Davies – choir
 Bernie Dresel – drums
 Sheila E. – drums, percussion
 Claire Everett – choir
 Amy Fogerson – choir
 Greg Geiger – choir
 Mike Geiger – choir, choir arrangements
 Grant Gershon – choir
 Stephen Grimm – choir
 Reggie Hamilton – upright bass
 John Hatton – bass guitar
 Alex "Crazy Legs" Henderson – trombone
 Michael Herring – acoustic guitar
 Ray Herrmann – alto saxophone, horn arrangements
 Robbie Hioki – bass trombone
 Marie Hodgson – choir
 Drew Holt – choir
 Elissa Jonston – choir
 Charles Lane – choir
 Gayle Levant – harp
 Robert Lewis – choir
 The London Session Orchestra – strings
 George McMullen – trombone
 Tim Misica – tenor saxophone
 Willie Murillo – trumpet
 Robbie Nevil – electric guitar
 Kevin Norton – trumpet
 Cassandra O'Neal – piano
 Kai Palmer – trumpet
 Dean Parks – acoustic guitar
 Helene Quintana – choir
 Kevin Richardson – trumpet
 Marty Rifkin – pedal steel guitar
 LeAnn Rimes – lead vocals
 John Roberts – baritone saxophone
 Leland Sklar – bass guitar
 Dino Soldo – harmonica
 Kimberly Switzer – choir
 Michael Thompson – dobro, acoustic guitar, electric guitar
 Arturo Velasco – trombone
 Patrick Warren – bells, organ, pump organ, string arrangements, synthesizer, synthesizer strings
 Jim Youngstrom – tenor saxophone
 Matthew Zebley – alto saxophone

Charts

References 

Curb Records albums
LeAnn Rimes albums
2004 Christmas albums
Christmas albums by American artists